Tavano is an Italian surname. Notable people with the surname include:

Anna Tavano, French Paralympic athlete
Francesco Tavano (born 1979), Italian footballer
Salvatore Tavano (born 1980), Italian racing driver
Fabrizio Tavano (born 1993), Mexican footballer

Italian-language surnames